The Chuck Norris Experiment also known as CNE is a Swedish hard rock band formed in 2004 with punk rock influences and is based in Gothenburg. The name is not a tribute to the actor Chuck Norris, but rather to the American blues guitarist Charles "Chuck" Norris. The debut album was the self-titled Chuck Norris Experiment in 2005 on the Italian record label Scarey Records and the Finnish label Bad Attitude Records, and in the USA by Devil Doll Records with adding of two bonus tracks. The band has released 8 studio albums and in 2012, a split album with Nick Oliveri.

Members
Chuck Ransom - vocals
Chuck Rooster - guitar
Chuck The Ripper - guitar
Chuck Dakota - bass
Chuck Buzz - drums

Discography

Albums
Studio albums
2005: Chuck Norris Experiment
2006: Volume! Voltage!
2007: ...And The Rest Will Follow 
2008: The Return Of Rock'n'Roll 
2009: The Chuckies 
2010: Dead Central
2014: Right Between The Eyes (peak at 23 on Sverigetopplistan)
2017: Chück Me!

Compilation albums
2010: Hot Stuff
2012: Best Of The First Five
2018: Hotter Stuff

Live albums
2013: Live At Rockpalast
2016: Live In London

Collaborations
2012: Nick Oliveri / Chuck Norris Experiment (split album with Nick Oliveri)

References

External links
Official website
Facebook
Discogs

Swedish rock music groups